AIAN or (American Indian and Alaska Native Resources) is an abbreviation used by the United States Census Bureau to count population within the Native American and Alaska Natives areas within the United States.  The US Census uses other abbreviations such as CDP or census-designated places as well in determining populations within different states.

AIAN of U.S. States

Alabama

Cher-O-Creek SDTSA
Cherokee Tribe of Northeast Alabama
Echota Cherokee Tribe of Alabama
MaChis Lower Creek SDTSA
MOWA Choctaw (state) Reservation
Poarch Creek Indian Reservation and Off-Reservation Trust Land
Star Muskogee Creek SDTSA
United Cherokee Ani-Yun-Wiya Nation SDTSA

Alaska

 see List of Alaska Native tribal entities

Arizona

 21 AIAN areas

California

Alturas Indian Rancheria
Auburn Rancheria
Agua Caliente Indian Reservation
Augustine Reservation
Barona Reservation 
Benton Reservation
Berry Creek Rancheria
Big Bend Rancheria
Big Lagoon Rancheria
Big Pine Reservation (Paiute Tribe of Owens Valley)
Big Sandy Rancheria
Bishop Paiute Tribe
Blue Lake Rancheria & Off-Reservation Trust Land
Bridgeport Reservation
Cabazon Reservation
Cahuilla Reservation
Campo Indian Reservation
Capitan Grande Reservation
Cedarville Rancheria
Chemehuevi Reservation
Chicken Ranch Rancheria
Cold Springs Rancheria
Colorado River Indian Reservation
Colusa Indian Rancheria
Cortina Indian Rancheria
Coyote Valley Rancheria
Dry Creek Rancheria
Elk Valley Rancheria
Enterprise Rancheria
Ewiiaapaayp Reservation 
Fort Bidwell Reservation
Fort Independence Reservation (Paiute Tribe)
Fort Mojave Indian ReservationFort Yuma Indian Reservation
Greenville Rancheria (Maidu Indians)
Grindstone Rancheria
Guidiville Rancheria
Hoopa Valley Reservation
Hopland Rancheria
Ione Band of Miwok TDSA
Inaja and Cosmit Reservation
Jamul Indian Village
Karuk Reservation & Off-Reservation Trust Land
Laytonville Rancheria
La Jolla Reservation
La Posta Indian Reservation
Likely Rancheria
Lone Pine Reservation (Paiute-Shoshone Tribe)
Los Coyotes Reservation
Lookout Rancheria
Manchester-Point Arena Rancheria
Manzanita Reservation
Mesa Grande Reservation
Montgomery Creek Rancheria
Morongo Reservation
Northfork Rancheria of Mono Indians of California
Pala Indian Reservation
Paskenta Rancheria
Pauma and Yuima Reservation
Pechanga Reservation
Picayune Rancheria of Chukchansi Indians
Pinoleville Rancheria
Quartz Valley Reservation
Redding Rancheria
Redwood Valley Rancheria
Resighini Rancheria
Rincon Reservation
Roaring Creek Rancheria
Rohnerville Rancheria
Romona Village
Round Valley Reservation
Rumsey Indian Rancheria
San Manuel Reservation
San Pasqual Reservation
Santa Rosa Rancheria
Santa Rosa Reservation
Santa Ynez Reservation
Santa Ysabel Reservation
Sherwood Valley Rancheria
Shingle Springs Rancheria
Soboba Reservation
Smith River Rancheria
Stewarts Point Rancheria
Susanville Indian Rancheria
Sycuan Reservation
Table Bluff Reservation (Wiyot Tribe)
Table Mountain Rancheria
Timbi-Sha Shoshone Reservation
Torres-Martinez Reservation (Desert Cahuilla Indians)
Trinidad Rancheria
Tule River Reservation
Tuolumne Rancheria
Twenty-Nine Reservation
Viejas Reservation 
Woodsford Community
XL Ranch Rancheria
Yurok Indian Reservation

 8 more AIAN areas

Colorado

 2 AIAN areas

Connecticut

 5 AIAN areas

Delaware

 2 AIAN areas

Florida

 10 AIAN areas

Georgia

 1 AIAN areas

Hawaii

 76 AIAN areas

Idaho

 5 AIAN areas

Iowa

 Sac and Fox/Meskwaki Settlement

Kansas

 5 AIAN areas

Louisiana

 9 AIAN areas

Maine

 6 AIAN areas

Massachusetts

 2 AIAN areas

Michigan

 13 AIAN areas

Minnesota

 13 AIAN areas

Mississippi

 1 AIAN areas

Montana

 8 AIAN areas

Nebraska

 7 AIAN areas

Nevada

 28 AIAN areas

New Jersey

 2 AIAN areas

New Mexico

 25 AIAN areas

New York

 11 AIAN areas

North Carolina

 8 AIAN areas

North Dakota

 5 AIAN areas

Oklahoma

 30 AIAN areas

Oregon

 11 AIAN areas

Rhode Island

 1 AIAN areas

South Carolina

 7 AIAN areas

South Dakota

 11 AIAN areas

Texas

 3 AIAN areas

Utah

 7 AIAN areas

Virginia

 4 AIAN areas

Washington

 28 AIAN areas

Wisconsin

 12 AIAN areas

Wyoming

 1 AIAN areas

References

 
Native American people
United States Census Bureau